XOXO may refer to:

 Hugs and kisses, a way to express affection

Music
 XOXO, Panda and the New Kid Revival, a 2008 album by Her Space Holiday
 "X.O.X.O.", a song by Miliyah Kato from the 2010 album Heaven
 "xoxo", a 2011 digital single from Humming Urban Stereo
 "XOXO" (song), a song from the 2021 album XOXO by Jeon Somi
 XOXO, a 2011 album by Casper
 XOXO (Exo album), a 2013 album from the South Korean-Chinese boy band Exo
 "XOXO", a song by Ayumi Hamasaki from her 2014 album Colours
 XOXO (Jayhawks album) 2020 album from the alternative country band The Jayhawks
 XOXO (Jeon Somi album), a 2021 album from Canadian-Dutch-Korean singer Jeon Somi

Other uses
 XOXO (brand), a contemporary brand of clothing and accessories geared toward teenage girls
 XOXO (festival), an arts and technology festival and conference held annually in September in Portland, Oregon
 XOXO (microformat) or eXtensible Open XHTML Outlines, an XML microformat for outlines built on top of XHTML
 XOXO (film), an American drama and music film
 Xoxo, Cape Verde
 Santa Cruz Xoxocotlán, Mexico, commonly referred to as "Xoxo"

See also
 "XOXOXO", a song by The Black Eyed Peas from the 2010 album The Beginning
 XO (disambiguation)
 X's and O's (disambiguation)